Liberine is an isolate of coffee beans, tea, cola nuts, guarana, cocoa, and yerba mate.

References

Purines
Alkaloids
Methoxy compounds